

151001–151100 

|-bgcolor=#f2f2f2
| colspan=4 align=center | 
|}

151101–151200 

|-bgcolor=#f2f2f2
| colspan=4 align=center | 
|}

151201–151300 

|-id=242
| 151242 Hajós ||  || Alfréd Hajós (1878–1955), Hungarian swimmer and architect || 
|}

151301–151400 

|-id=349
| 151349 Stanleycooper ||  || Stanley B. Cooper (born 1944), of Johns Hopkins University Applied Physics Laboratory, served as the lead engineer for the spacecraft time-keeping system for the New Horizons mission to Pluto. || 
|-id=351
| 151351 Dalleore ||  || Cristina M. Dalle Ore (born 1958) is a senior scientist at the SETI Institute, who served as a composition science team member for the New Horizons mission to Pluto. || 
|-id=362
| 151362 Chenkegong ||  || Chen Kegong (1922–2002), grandfather of Chinese astronomer Ye Quan-Zhi, who discovered this minor planet || 
|}

151401–151500 

|-id=430
| 151430 Nemunas ||  || Nemunas River, the largest river in Lithuania || 
|}

151501–151600 

|-id=590
| 151590 Fan ||  || Xiaohui Fan (born 1971), Chinese-American astronomer with the Sloan Digital Sky Survey who studies of the most distant quasars || 
|}

151601–151700 

|-id=657
| 151657 Finkbeiner ||  || Douglas Finkbeiner (born 1971), American astrophysicist with the Sloan Digital Sky Survey || 
|-id=659
| 151659 Egerszegi ||  || Krisztina Egerszegi (born 1974), Hungarian swimmer || 
|-id=697
| 151697 Paolobattaini ||  || Paolo Battaini (1955–2013), Italian amateur astronomer at the Schiaparelli Observatory  in Varese and popularizer on the legacy of Giovanni Schiaparelli and of the exploration of Mars. || 
|}

151701–151800 

|-bgcolor=#f2f2f2
| colspan=4 align=center | 
|}

151801–151900 

|-id=834
| 151834 Mongkut ||  || King Mongkut (or Rama IV, 1804–1868) was the monarch of Siam from 1851 to 1868. He embraced Western innovations and initiated the modernization of Siam, both in technology and culture, earning him the nickname "The Father of Science and Technology". || 
|-id=835
| 151835 Christinarichey ||  || Christina Rae Richey (born 1982) is a discipline scientist for the Planetary Science Division at NASA Headquarters. She has championed the cause of minorities in science and has investigated properties of ices, silicate and carbonaceous materials || 
|}

151901–152000 

|-id=997
| 151997 Bauhinia ||  || Bauhinia blakeana (the Hong Kong orchid tree), the Hong Kong City Flower || 
|}

References 

151001-152000